Knema lenta is a small tree species in the genus Knema, of the family Myristicaceae. It may be a synonym of Knema glauca (Bl.) Warb. and is called: 狭叶红光树 xia ye hong guang shu in Chinese and máu chó thấu kính in Vietnamese.

Description

References

Flora of Indo-China
lenta